Dublin, Wicklow and Wexford Railway (DW&WR) 4 and 5 were a pair of 0-6-2T tank locomotives purchased from Kitson & Co. in 1897 and rebuilt as 0-6-0 tender Locomotives in 1908 due to a tendency to derail.  Renumbered by Great Southern Railways to 448 and 449 they survived until 1940 and 1950 respectively.

History

Background
Thomas Grierson rose to become Chief Engineer of the DW&WR in 1894/95 taking combined responsibility for both the civil and mechanical sides of the operation, these roles being separate before his tenure and were to again be separated after he left in May 1897.  Grierson was a civil engineer and decisions and views he held were to be questioned.  He is understood to have held the theory that tenders were less economic than tank engines due to the need to haul around the weight of the tender.. The error of ordering Express passenger 4-4-0s and the selection and issues with this class seem to have sullied Grierson's reputation.

Shepherd and Beesley suggested the DW&WR had identified a need for additional goods and tank locomotives in March 1896, with the construction of the extension to Waterford and the haulage of heavy goods from New Ross to  being major considerations.

Design and Procurement
To satisfy motive powers requirements Grierson ordered two  locomotives from Kitson & Co. for £2,575 each in April 1896. Their design were based on the eight Class A delivered to the Lancashire, Derbyshire and East Coast Railway from 1895, with the Rhondda and Swansea Bay Railway also acquiring some of the type.  

With hindsight Shepherd and Beesley classified the order as "Grierson's Folly".

Service as 0-6-2T
In the event by the time they arrived in April 1897, Grierson was on the cusp of departure and Robert Cronin about to take over as Locomotive Superintendent. These locomotives, No. 4 Lismore and No. 5Clonmel, were found to have problems by exceeding the maximum axle load and having issues with hot-running axle boxes. They were also prone to derailments, caused by the excess weight on the trailing axle. Following a derailment at North Wall yard| in June 1897 a weighing at the Great Southern and Western Railway Inchicore Railway Works showed the weights of the locomotives to be  and  respectively, far in excess of the  that had been specified to Kitson by Grierson.

Rebuild and service as 0-6-0
After the short period of only eleven years in 1908 Cronin rebuilt the locomotives as 0-6-0 tender engines with Belpaire boilers, the new tenders being built by the Grand Canal Street railway works. The rebuild produced engines of strong power however they were noted for very high coal and water consumption and a tendency to stall on the gradient if the boiler pressure dropped. There was usually no trouble restarting once the boiler pressure had been regained.

On the merger of the railways in Ireland to Great Southern Railways in 1925 these locomotives became allocated class 448 with numbers 448 and 449.   No. 4/448 was withdrawn in 1940.  No. 5/449 survived the nationalisation to CIÉ in 1945 and in an assessment in 1948 the rating of the class was "quite good".  That did not seem to stop No. 5/449 being withdrawn in 1950.

Engine number 4/448 had a couple of other milestones.  It was the last locomotive to be rebuilt at Grand Canal Street and was the final locomotive to retain Dublin and South Eastern Railway (DSER) livery until being painted GSR grey in 1930.

References

Notes

Footnotes

Sources
 
 
 
 

0-6-2T locomotives
0-6-0 locomotives
5 ft 3 in gauge locomotives
Railway locomotives introduced in 1897
Steam locomotives of Ireland
Kitson locomotives
Scrapped locomotives